Stratford-upon-Avon College is an English further education college in Stratford-upon-Avon, Warwickshire.

History 
Funded by public money, the College began in Stratford-upon-Avon with the establishment of a School of Art in the summer of 1877.

Weekly classes were held in a room in Stratford-upon-Avon Town Hall - a Private Morning Class for Ladies; a Private Afternoon Class for Gentlemen; and Evening Classes for Teachers in Public Schools, Artisans and others.

In 1881 the School of Art moved to a new Art Studio in Sheep Street, Stratford-upon-Avon. In 1891, under the Technical Instruction Act 1889, rate support from the County Council was available, administered by Stratford Borough Council, to subsidise still further the Art School.

A number of special classes were started, in various Stratford locations, on butter and cheese-making (from 1891), cooking (from 1892), and wood carving, shorthand, dress cutting, laundry, and cottage nursing (from 1893).

The School of Art’s name was changed to Stratford-upon-Avon School of Science and Art.

In 1958 Stratford Technical and Art School was renamed South Warwickshire College of Further Education to recognise its very large catchment area including the Borough and the three rural districts of Stratford, Shipston and Alcester.

In 1968 the College moved to its present location at The Willows North. The Principal at the time, and throughout most of the 1970s, was Charles Jeffery: he was instrumental in setting up the Drama and Liberal Arts department and in appointing Gordon Vallins as its head. Vallins pioneered the Theatre Studies GCE A level syllabus. In September 1968, when the new College opened, there were 115 full-time students; in September 1976: 593; and the projected figure for 1977 was 630+.

In addition there were block-release and day-release classes for industry and a wide range of other part-time day and evening classes, giving a total student population of about 2,500.

In 1993, upon Incorporation, the name of South Warwickshire College of Further Education was changed to Stratford-upon-Avon College.

In February 2018, Stratford-upon-Avon College merged with Solihull College and University Centre.

Heart of England International Academy
In 2007, Stratford-upon-Avon College (est. 1877) joined with City College Coventry (est. 1832) to form the Heart of England International Academy (HEIA) in order to build upon the long-standing successes enjoyed by countless international students who have studied at each college for many years.

The HEIA has standing reputation as an outstanding provider of education and training designed specifically to support the international learner on their journey in becoming a global citizen. Whilst the provision of high quality international education and training is at the very heart of what it does, the HEIA also engages widely in cultural, business and educational institution links and projects with many partners across the globe.

Campus 
The main campus of the college is at The Willows North.

Academic profile 
The college offers a wide range of courses including Apprenticeships, Vocational Qualifications including BTEC diplomas, Foundation Learning, and Higher Education programmes including HNCs, HNDs and Degrees.

Student life 
The college runs a Football Academy at Stratford Town Football Club in conjunction with Coventry City FC's Academy; their team won the British College Sports West Midlands Football League in 2010/11.

The campus is a located a short walk from Stratford-upon-Avon town centre and The Maybird shopping centre, and is situated opposite Stratford-upon-Avon Railway Station and Morrisons. The college offers counselling services for students, and runs weekly tutorial and enrichment sessions. The Oasis Cafe, The Brazz and The Academy restaurants, and student accommodation  are all located on campus. The Learn Zone provides an information resource and IT centre for students. During each year, two College students sit on the college's governing board as Student Governors.

Organisation and administration

Partnerships

UK
 Shakespeare Birthplace Trust
 Leeds College of Music
 University of Warwick

China
 School of Humanity, Zhejiang University
 Qingdao University of Science & Technology
 Anhui Normal University Education Group
 Lishui University
 Zhejiang Ningbo Fenghua High School
 Zhejiang Suichang High School
 Beijing Shengji Art School

Hong Kong
 Hong Kong IVE - Haking Wong, Hong Kong Vocational Training Council

Kazakhstan
 Astana College of Business Management

Malaysia
 IMPERIA, College of Hospitality

Spain
 Gredos San Diego Colegios, Madrid

Notable alumni 

Leo Bill, Actor
Ben Elton, Comedian, writer, actor, author and director
Stuart Goldsmith, Actor
Jo Joyner, Actress and current star of EastEnders
Joseph Mawle, Actor
Tobias Menzies, Actor
Sarah Jane Morris, Rock, blues, jazz and soul singer/songwriter
Simon Pegg, Comedian turned actor/writer
Lauren Samuels, West End actress
Tony Tobin, Celebrity chef
Melissa Walton, Actress and star of Hollyoaks
Parry Glasspool, Actor, notable for his role as Harry Thompson in the teenage soap, Hollyoaks

See also
 Education in England
 Further Education

References

External links
 Official website
 Alumni
 Ofsted Report

Further education colleges in Warwickshire
Buildings and structures in Stratford-upon-Avon